Michele Gioia (born 31 July 1971) is an Italian former footballer.

Playing career 
Gioia began in Serie C1 for the 1987–88 season with Reggio Audace F.C. The following season he signed with Spezia Calcio, where he played in the 1989–90 Coppa Italia against Inter Milan in the first round. In 1991, he played in the Lega Pro Seconda Divisione with Calcio Lecco 1912. In 1994, he played abroad in the Canadian National Soccer League with the Toronto Jets. In 1996, he played with Toronto Italia after they merged with the Toronto Jets.

In his debut season with Italia he finished as the league's top goalscorer, and helped produce a perfect season. He featured in the CNSL All-Star match for Italia which included Diego Maradona. He was also given the league's MVP award. In 1997, he signed with the Montreal Impact in the USISL A-League. In the middle of the season he was acquired by the Toronto Lynx, and recorded his first goals on 24 August 1997 against Long Island Rough Riders.

In 1999, he played in the Eccellenza Basilicata with A.S. Materasassi.

References 

1971 births
Living people
Italian footballers
A.C. Reggiana 1919 players
Spezia Calcio players
Calcio Lecco 1912 players
Toronto Italia players
Montreal Impact (1992–2011) players
Toronto Lynx players
Serie C players
Canadian National Soccer League players
A-League (1995–2004) players
Eccellenza players
Association football forwards
Italian expatriate footballers
Italian expatriate sportspeople in Canada
Expatriate soccer players in Canada